Kakoli (also Romanized as Kākolī; also known as Kākūlī) is a village in Sigar Rural District, in the Central District of Lamerd County, Fars Province, Iran. At the 2006 census, its population was 203, in 40 families.

References 

Populated places in Lamerd County